Langelurillus namibicus is a jumping spider species in the genus Langelurillus that lives in Namibia and South Africa. The female was described by Wanda Wesołowska in 2011; the male has yet to be described.

References

Spiders described in 2011
Spiders of Africa
Spiders of South Africa
Fauna of Namibia
Salticidae
Taxa named by Wanda Wesołowska